Space Miner: Space Ore Bust is an iOS role-playing game developed by Venan Entertainment and released on February 5, 2010.

Critical reception
The game has a rating of 91% on Metacritic based on nine critic reviews.

SlideToPlay wrote "Asteroid blasting has never been so fun… and profitable." No DPad said "But I'm a sucker for space shooters and now it's turned me completely on my head. I've been mining the app store for gems, and in Space Miner I've struck pay dirt. Like comets, games like this are rarely seen. Don't let this one pass you by." TouchArcade said "Whatever sort of gamer you are, don't miss Space Miner: Space Ore Bust." AppSpy wrote "Space Miner is an addictive, well polished Asteroids clone, that mixes fast paced space combat with RPG inspired ship upgrading. This game is highly recommended." 148Apps said "The RPG elements are fantastic, the story is great, and the graphics and sound are amazing. In a game like this, I would expect longevity to be a concern, but if you do everything in the game, it will probably take you 10-15 hours… and maybe more, to complete."

Multiplayer.it said "Though the controls are a little hard to get used to, Space Miner: Space Ore Bust delivers an awesome gameplay, lots of missions and upgrades, all held together by a funny plot. A very nice experience." DigitalChumps wrote "The game is very accessible and is also addictive and rewarding enough to keep you going." PocketGamerUK said "Space Miner is sitting on a gold mine of charming gameplay, yet awkward controls and gameplay imbalances keep it from reaching its full potential." IGN wrote "The combination of Asteroids with resource management and RPG upgrades is a winner, although I really hope for an update that offers dual stick controls."

References

2010 video games
IOS games
GameClub games
IOS-only games
Role-playing video games
Video games developed in the United States